Titudah Union is a union parishad of Chuadanga Sadar Upazila, Chuadanga District, Khulna Division, Bangladesh. There are 26 villages and 21 mouzas in the union.

References

External links
 

Unions of Khulna Division
Unions of Chuadanga District
Unions of Chuadanga Sadar Upazila